Walter Verini (born 17 January 1956) is an Italian politician, member of the Democratic Party.

Biography
Professional journalist since 1978, Verini worked in various newspapers and local radio and TV stations in Umbria, and he was director of some of these: he worked on Paese Sera and L'Unità, and directed YouDem, newspaper of the Democratic Party.

Political career
Verini held various political-administrative positions in Umbria until 1996, when he began to collaborate with Walter Veltroni, being head of Veltroni's secretariat when he was Minister of cultural heritage and Deputy Prime Minister, secretary of the Democrats of the Left, mayor of Rome and finally secretary of the Democratic Party.

He was elected to the Chamber of Deputies for the first time in the 2008 elections in the Umbria constituency. In the 2013 elections and the 2018 elections he was re-elected deputy in the same constituency for the Democratic Party.

In 2019, the secretary of the Democratic Party Nicola Zingaretti appointed him commissioner of the Democratic Party in Umbria, an office he held until 2020. In 2019, Verini was appointed Treasurer of the Democratic Party by its national assembly.

In the 2022 snap elections, Verini was elected to the Senate with the list Democratic Party - Democratic and Progressive Italy.

References

External links 
Files about his parliamentary activities (in Italian): XVI,XVII, XVIII, XIX legislature

1956 births
Living people
Italian Communist Party politicians
Democratic Party of the Left politicians
Democrats of the Left politicians
Democratic Party (Italy) politicians
21st-century Italian politicians
Deputies of Legislature XVI of Italy
Deputies of Legislature XVII of Italy
Deputies of Legislature XVIII of Italy
Senators of Legislature XIX of Italy